Türkmenoğlu can refer to:

 Türkmenoğlu, Devrek
 Türkmenoğlu, Erzincan